ShadowHawk is a fictional antihero created by Jim Valentino.

He was first advertised in the Malibu Sun free promotional magazine in May of 1992. His official Image Comics debut was in the second issue of Rob Liefeld's Youngblood series.

Originally, the name ShadowHawk was to be used for the Marvel character Starhawk while he had darkness powers, but Tom DeFalco convinced Valentino to use the name for a new character instead.

Paul Johnstone

Fictional character biography
Paul Johnstone grew up as a troubled youth in Harlem, New York City. He avoided a life of crime due in part to the encouragement of a man named Richard Woodroe, who was originally assigned as a caseworker to Paul when he was caught stealing, and eventually married his mother, becoming his stepfather.

Eventually, Paul became a lawyer and, beyond that, a district attorney. While his life was going so well, his half brother Hojo had taken his success in college, moved to Wall Street and developed a Coke and crack addiction. Using Hojo, some gangsters tried to leverage Paul into letting their men off, but Paul refused. Soon after he ended up the target of an assault intended to serve as an example to others who got in the way of these mobsters. This incident culminated in his attackers injecting him with HIV-infected blood.

After the encounter, Johnstone was left uncertain regarding whether he had been infected or not. The attack had been made public and word of his possible infection spread through Johnstone's workplace, making it a very inhospitable environment to be in. Tensions between Johnstone and one of his co-workers led to an altercation between the two which landed Johnstone out of a job and in jail.

After he was released, Paul received medical confirmation that he was HIV positive and he descended into depression. While walking the streets to clear his head, Paul was threatened by a group of young gang members. He went berserk and attacked them, leading to his brutal mugging and return to the hospital. During this time he resolved that he would use the rest of his time to dispense justice to the individuals who preyed on innocent victims. One of his friends, a cop named Christina Reid (who had been kicked off the force that day for use of excessive force), was also in the hospital and came to visit him. She informed Paul that she and a man named Carlton Sun had been developing an exoskeleton suit of armor that could help aid him in accomplishing this task.

Johnstone decided to don the suit, christening himself "ShadowHawk" after his favorite superhero (a name that would eventually lure out the psychotic and racist villain Hawk's Shadow, who believed he was the one entitled to bear the mantle of ShadowHawk), and was taught how to fight effectively with the help of Christine, promising to "take back the night". Johnstone also kept the pills needed to slow his reaction to his HIV infection in small pouches on his belt so he could take them as needed.

Early on, ShadowHawk's actions against criminals were brutal. He would catch violent criminals in the act and break their spines, leaving them to be discovered by police with no indication that he had attacked them other than hearsay from the criminals. This led to ShadowHawk garnering a reputation as an urban legend as well as being hunted by both criminals and law enforcement alike. Johnstone would also face various supervillains, including crime-boss Vendetta, her gang the Regulators (Blackjack, Vort-X, Arson, Hardedge and Scandal), the acidic mutant Liquifier, super-powered hitman Dedline and the racist ShadowHawk copycat Hawk's Shadow. ShadowHawk also encounters other superheroes such as Spawn and The Savage Dragon. ShadowHawk would later become a member of the superhero group Brigade.

Later in his career (and as his lifespan shortened due to the progression of HIV to AIDS), Johnstone eventually grew to be less violent. He encounters Trencher and his dispatcher Phoebe; who agrees to assist him in his search for a cure to his infection or another way to extend his life. This led to encounters with the likes of   Youngblood's Chapel (another hero also infected with HIV), Bloodstrike and ShadowHawk team-up with each other in the hopes of finding a cure. He then teams up with the WildC.A.T.s (who offered a possible solution involving a robotic body to transplant Johnstone's consciousness into – which would ultimately fail to work). ShadowHawk then visited the Others in a similar attempt, where they attempt to exorcise the spirit of the virus from his body, which ultimately fails. He is then transported into an encounter with Supreme (in which a battle would ensue, leading to the discovery of ShadowHawk's true identity to the world), then encounters Badrock and company in another attempt at changing his body's structure in order to live longer, again leaving in failure, and finally meeting Spawn in his alleyways who, with the help of Trencher and Phoebe, convince him to accept his inevitable death from the virus. One of his few regrets was that he never got to join a super-group, as in his search for a cure, he had realized how useful and fun fighting in a group was.

In his final act as ShadowHawk, Johnstone would rescue his mother from being attacked by Hawk's Shadow. The aftermath of the fight would leave Johnstone in a weakened state and unable to elude the pursuit of the police. He was remanded into custody and transported to a hospital where AIDS eventually took its toll and ended his life.

Edward Collins

In the wake of Paul Johnstone's death, it was revealed that ShadowHawk is in fact a "Spirit of Justice" and the spirit has inhabited at least four people in the past. Three of the revealed ShadowHawks were human, the last one being a robot. The three human ShadowHawks dealt with villains such as big game huntress Trophy, the toxic mutant Glortch, the mutant crime-boss Joe the Blowfish and the street gang of super-villains the Junkyard Dogz (Hotspur, Rumble Doll, Fast Lucy, Guncrazy and Needle). One of the ShadowHawks included Paul Johnstone's accomplice, Christina Reid. Like Johnstone, the New ShadowHawks become members of Brigade.

After the Spirit of Justice leaves the robot it becomes "Justice", without human feelings and starts to kill people. The saga of the robot ShadowHawk was told in a crossover story called "ShadowHunt", which ran through five Image titles in April 1996. At the end of New Man #4, the robot was destroyed.

The New ShadowHawk
After the robot is destroyed, Eddie Collins, a young high school student, makes his debut as the new ShadowHawk. Having just moved to New York with his recently widowed father James, an electrician, Eddie was walking down a street when the helmet literally fell into his hands. The helmet – called "Nommo" – contains the spirits of all people who were, at one time, inhabited by ShadowHawk, the Spirit of Justice. Eddie Collins tried to meditate with the Nommo on, meeting the spirit of Paul Johnstone, who tells Eddie that he is a reincarnation of a first dynasty Egyptian shaman, how he was the prior ShadowHawk and that Eddie is destined to start anew.

At first Eddie's father orders him to stop, thinking it would kill him. But Eddie is faster, stronger and more agile now and finds new responsibility to the people of New York City. After saving some hostages, Eddie meets Captain Nieves and starts working with him.

Jim Valentino's ShadowHawk
Blacklight, a 1960s "Hippie Hero" wakes up from a 30-year coma and learns his wife Dayglo was killed 10 years ago by a villain called Firepower. He is falsely told by a mysterious man that ShadowHawk is the son of Firepower. Blacklight later attacks ShadowHawk and is accidentally killed by him. After killing Blacklight, ShadowHawk faces a mercenary named ZAP. After ZAP is defeated, police propose that Eddie Collins go through the Police Academy to learn the difference between superhero and vigilante. Eddie is attacked by the man who hired ZAP and lied to Blacklight, named Nocturn.

Out on patrol, Nocturn, who knows Eddie Collins is ShadowHawk, attacks him. After a brutal fight, Hawk's Shadow comes out of the shadows to face his "returned" arch-enemy. After being beaten nearly to death, ShadowHawk faces Hawk's Shadow, who wants the helmet that gives ShadowHawk his powers. In the end, Paul Johnstone usurps Eddie's body and beats Hawk's Shadow to near death, but Eddie stops him before the kill.

Soon, Eddie meets the new Blacklight, who is investigating the origin of her new-found powers. The two team-up to bring a vicious monster down. Their target turns out to be the first Blacklight.

Eddie's mentally unstable classmate, Philip Marko discovers he has the power of pyrokinesis. After killing ten people at the high school and his mother, ShadowHawk stops him.

A man-beast named Komodo kills Eddie's best friend, Steven "Skeeve" Evans and defeats ShadowHawk. The helmet, the source of ShadowHawk's power, is taken by Hawk's Shadow, who steps in and kills Komodo. He is soon confronted by his father, the Silver Age ShadowHawk. With the help of the new Blacklight, and Astroman, Eddie goes after Hatfield (Hawk's Shadow) and wins, taking back the helmet.

After hearing the stories of past ShadowHawks, Eddie Collins makes the decision that now he is going to be ShadowHawk on his terms and receives a new costume.

Steven Evans' younger brother blames Shadowhawk for his brothers death and seeks revenge, while Hawk's Shadow's brain is placed in Komodo's body.

Silver Age ShadowHawk

The Silver Age ShadowHawk is a parody of the Jack Schiff-era Batman comics. He works out of the Shadowcave which is in the basement of his house, has a Shadowcar and a Shadowdog. His wife and son are his crimefighting partners, Lady ShadowHawkette and Squirrel. Squirrel went on to become Hawk's Shadow.

The ShadowHawk Special featured two Silver Age ShadowHawk stories. In "The Hyena's Revenge" ShadowHawk and Squirrel hunt the Hyena, a villain based on the Joker. The second was "The Phantom Gorillas from Dimension-Z!" The Silver Age ShadowHawk also appeared with the Silver Age Knight Watchman in Big Bang Comics #2.

The story "Rising" in issue #11 of Jim Valentino's ShadowHawk described Hatfield Sr and his family's final fight against the Hyena and the death of Lady ShadowHawkette.

ShadowHawk: Resurrection
Image Comics published a new ShadowHawk ongoing series following the events of Image United. The series featured Paul Johnstone, the original ShadowHawk, as wearing the helmet once again 15 years after his death. The story was written by Dan Wickline, and the art by Tone Rodriguez and Jim Valentino. The series also featured covers by Erik Larsen and Frank Bravo. Variant covers for ShadowHawk: Resurrection took homage from older issues of ShadowHawk titles and other notable covers throughout comic history. Notably, #3 featured a variant that was styled after the glow-in-the-dark cover for ShadowHawk (1st series) issue #3, while issue #5 featured a variant cover that paid homage to the "Death of Supergirl" cover of Crisis on Infinite Earths #7.

Bomb Queen VII: The End Of Hope
In Bomb Queen VII: The End Of Hope, released from December 2011 to May 2012, after being killed by Rebound 100 years prior, Bomb Queen awakens in a techno-dependent future protected by ShadowHawk, who now inhabits the closest members of the human race to ongoing crimes, regularly switching between bodies. As their battle continues, despite their moral opposition, Bomb Queen gradually begins to fall in love with him.

Toys
Two action figures of ShadowHawk have been released in the past by McFarlane Toys.

In 2009, Shocker Toys released two ShadowHawk figures as part of the first series of its "Indie Spotlight" line.

See also
Brigade
The Pact
Image United
Trencher (comics)

References

Citations

Sources
ShadowHawk info at internationalhero.co.uk

External links

ShadowHawk page at valentinocomics.com
"Valentino & his creations emerge from the shadows again" by Patrick Luce
WeirdSpace Encyclopedia entry on Paul Johnstone
WeirdSpace Encyclopedia entry on Eddie Collins

Comics characters introduced in 1992
Image Comics limited series
Image Comics characters with superhuman strength
Shadowline titles
Image Comics male superheroes
Fictional characters from New York City
Fictional characters with HIV/AIDS
Fictional district attorneys
Fictional lawyers
Characters created by Jim Valentino
Vigilante characters in comics